Wilfong–Wilson Farm, also known as the Major Wilson House, is a historic farm and national historic district located near Startown, Catawba County, North Carolina. The district encompasses 2 contributing buildings, 1 contributing site and 2 contributing structures. The house was built about 1830, and is a two-story, Federal style frame farmhouse.  Also on the property are the contributing log smokehouse, corn crib, and potato house.

It was added to the National Register of Historic Places in 1990.

References

Farms on the National Register of Historic Places in North Carolina
Historic districts on the National Register of Historic Places in North Carolina
Federal architecture in North Carolina
Houses completed in 1830
Houses in Catawba County, North Carolina
National Register of Historic Places in Catawba County, North Carolina
1830 establishments in North Carolina